Verneuil may refer to:

Places in France

Verneuil, former municipality, now merged with Moussy-Verneuil, Aisne department
Verneuil, Charente, in the Charente department
Verneuil, Cher, in the Cher department
Verneuil, Marne, in the Marne department
Verneuil, Nièvre, in the Nièvre department
Verneuil-en-Bourbonnais, in the Allier department
Verneuil-en-Halatte, in the Oise department
Verneuil-Grand, in the Meuse department
Verneuil-le-Château, in the Indre-et-Loire department
Verneuil-l'Étang, in the Seine-et-Marne department
Verneuil-Moustiers, in the Haute-Vienne department
Verneuil-Petit, in the Meuse department
Verneuil-sous-Coucy, in the Aisne department
Verneuil-sur-Avre, in the Eure department
Verneuil-sur-Igneraie, in the Indre department
Verneuil-sur-Indre, in the Indre-et-Loire department
Verneuil-sur-Seine, in the Yvelines department
Verneuil-sur-Serre, in the Aisne department
Verneuil-sur-Vienne, in the Haute-Vienne department

People
 Aristide Auguste Stanislas Verneuil (1823–1895), a French physician and surgeon
 Auguste Victor Louis Verneuil (1856–1913), a French chemist
 Henri Verneuil (1920–2002), a French-Armenian playwright and filmmaker
 Louis Verneuil (1893–1952), a French writer and actor
 Maurice Pillard Verneuil (1869–1942), a French designer

History
 Verneuil method or Verneuil process, by which artificial gemstones are grown
 Battle of Verneuil, an English victory in the Hundred Years' War
 Marquisate de Verneuil, created in 1600 in Verneuil-en-Halatte
 Duchy-Peerage of Verneuil, created in 1652, also in Verneuil-en-Halatte